The Castello di Montecuccolo is a castle in Pavullo nel Frignano, Modena, Italy.

Construction

The castle's primary tower was built in the 11th century as a watchtower for the protection of the surrounding town. A defensive wooden palisade was constructed at its base. In the 12th century, an adjoining fortified house was built along with stone walls to replace the palisade.

Over the course of the 13th and 14th centuries, new buildings were constructed and the walls were extended to encompass them, creating an enclosed piazza. During the 15th and 16th centuries a church - the Church of San Lorenzo - was built enclosing a second, smaller, piazza at a lower level than the older castle buildings.

History

It was the birthplace of the 17th century condottiero Raimondo Montecuccoli.

See also

List of castles in Italy

References

Il Castello di Montecuccolo  
Locanda del Condottiero 
Visit Modena - Pavullo nel Frignano - Il castello di Montecuccolo 

Castles in Emilia-Romagna